The National Renaissance Party (NRP) was an American neo-fascist group founded in 1949 by James Madole. It was frequently in the headlines during the 1960s and 1970s for its involvement in violent protests and riots in New York City. After Madole's death in 1979 the party faded and had completely disappeared by 1981.

Background and party doctrine
The NRP was founded in January 1949 by James Madole through the merger of several earlier American fascist organizations. Its headquarters were in the Yorkville area of New York City. The NRP was named for a phrase from the Last will and testament of Adolf Hitler, which stated that "I die with a happy heart aware [that there] will spring up...the seed of a radiant renaissance of the National Socialist movement." By 1954, government investigators, although unable to determine the exact size of the party, estimated its membership to be between 200 and 700,  although historian John George thought that NRP membership never exceeded 50 at any given time. The group also had an "elite Security Echelon," headed in the 1960s by covertly Jewish United Klans of America leader and Odinist Dan Burros, who killed himself on the same day in 1965 that his ethnicity was revealed by The New York Times. By 1963 Madole was running the party out of his apartment at 10 West 90th Street.

The NRP used a blue lightning bolt within a white circle on a field of red as its symbol. The "Elite Guard" (stormtroopers) wore gray and black uniforms with armbands featuring a lightning bolt within a circle.

The NRP's doctrines included standard elements of fascism, including white supremacy, anti-semitism, and opposition to democracy. The party also endorsed standard racist ideas such as "the voluntary repatriation of the black man back to Africa" and the sterilization of black welfare recipients. It maintained ties with other neo-Nazi organizations, such as George Lincoln Rockwell's American Nazi Party, which occasionally supplied the NRP with fascist literature for distribution. Madole was also influenced by the theosophical ideas of Helena Blavatsky, which he used as a theoretical underpinning for his opposition to racial mixing. The NRP also maintained good relations with a number of far-out mystical groups, such as the Church of Satan, whose founder, Anton LaVey, was a personal friend of Madole's.

The National Renaissance
The NRP published a journal, The National Renaissance, which, unlike its political activities in New York City, was widely influential in far-right circles. In the early 1950s, H. Keith Thompson and Frederick Weiss subsidized a larger-than-usual print run of an issue of the magazine containing an essay by Francis Parker Yockey entitled What is Behind the Hanging of the Eleven Jews in Prague? on the Prague show trials of Rudolf Slánský and ten other Jewish members of the Communist Party of Czechoslovakia, which Yockey had attended. Eustace Mullins, who Martin A. Lee called "the NRP's self-proclaimed expert on the U.S. Federal Reserve," published his notorious article Adolf Hitler: An Appreciation in the journal as well.

HUAC investigation
The NRP was investigated by the House Un-American Activities Committee (HUAC) for possible prosecution under the Smith Act, although no action was ever taken in this regard. The investigation began in 1954, when HUAC commissioned a staff report on the group.

According to The New York Times, the report found "that the National Renaissance Party appeared to have controvened the Smith Act (against advocacy of overthrow of the Government by force or violence) as much as had the Communist party itself" and that the NRP "had 'virtually borrowed wholesale' from Fascist and Nazi dictators material for its program," which included the abolition of American democracy, a "fascist" economy controlled by corporations, deportation of "unassimilable" people and oppression of Jews.

Demonstrations and plots

Throughout the 1960s and 1970s the NRP held public demonstrations in New York, which often ended in violence.

May 25, 1963
On May 25, 1963, an NRP rally on First Avenue between 85th Street and 86th Street was attended by approximately 2500 hecklers who threw "eggs and oranges" at the participants while Jack Weiser, commander of the Jewish War Veterans of New York State, attempted to arrest James Madole for "inciting to riot against the Jewish people." At least one member, Louis Mostaccio, was arrested for assault on an NYPD detective as a result of this incident. Mostaccio, who attacked the detective with a flagpole, was convicted in June 1963 of assault but acquitted of the additional charge of "violating the weapons law by being in possession of the flagpole." Mostaccio ended up serving five days for his crime.

The White Castle plot
Later that year, 8 members of the NRP were arrested in New York and charged with "planning to incite rioting" at two White Castle restaurants in The Bronx. According to the charges, the NRP plotted riots in response to demonstrations sponsored by the Congress of Racial Equality demanding an end to racially discriminatory hiring practices at the White Castles. Madole and Dan Burros were among those arrested, and searches of the members' homes and vehicles turned up, in addition to the usual anti-semitic literature, a "crossbow, steel-tipped arrows, a revolver, a flare gun, a derringer, and a tear-gas pen and pencil set." In addition the weapons cache included "bottles of nitric acid, machetes, and bayonets."

The 8 NRP members were indicted in August 1963. District Attorney Isidore Dollinger was quoted in The New York Times as saying that he considered "the prosecution of these individuals, who are closely connected with the American Renaissance Party [sic] — a Nazi movement — to be of the utmost importance." Six of the 8 were sentenced in July 1964, with Madole and Burros, called "hate mongers" by the presiding judge, getting two years each. Soon thereafter both Burros and Madole were released pending appeal.

Controversies over NRP use of public facilities

Yorkville, Manhattan
In the summer of 1965, the NRP applied to the New York City Board of Education for permission to hold party meetings at the Robert Wagner Junior High School at 220 E. 76th Street in Yorkville. The Board initially refused, citing concerns that "the proposed meeting might tend to cause dissension or provoke disorder." Future United States Solicitor General and then New York City Corporation Counsel J. Lee Rankin informed Board president Lloyd K. Garrison in February 1966 that the NRP had a legal right to use the facility. One week after receiving Rankin's opinion, the Board voted to allow the NRP to meet at the school, a decision which was protested by the Anti-Defamation League of B'nai B'rith.

The NRP held its first meeting at the school on March 18, 1966. James Madole and others spoke to an audience of about 200 people, who greeted the NRP leadership with general derision. Major John Ryan, commander of the NRP security echelon, moved the audience to laughter with his claim that the NRP intended to "recruit and train clean-cut young men and women for the party." Ryan ended his speech by pronouncing the slogan "white man unite, white man fight."

Orange County, New York
In 1965 the Orange County, New York Board of Supervisors decided to allow political parties to hold meetings in court houses in Goshen and Newburgh and the NRP applied to use them. The Board refused, insisting that the NRP, rather than being a political party, was a "fascist" and "subversive" organization. The NRP sued, and, in June 1967, the New York Court of Appeals overruled the County's decision and a lower court, which had upheld it.
 
The NRP finally managed to arrange a meeting at the Orange County Courthouse in Newburgh on July 29, 1967. Protests against the meeting turned into riots in black sections of the small city and over 30 protestors were arrested for vandalism and throwing rocks at police officers.

The end of the NRP
Madole died of cancer in 1979. His mother Grace recruited Andrej Lisanik, a former Czech military officer in the World War II Czech army, to lead the party. Lisanik was killed by a mugger in 1980 and, as the bulk of the NRP membership details and party records were in his car when he was attacked, they were lost. Within a year the party was defunct.

See also

Esoteric Nazism
Matthias Koehl
Conde McGinley
Joe McWilliams
Kerry Bolton

References

Further reading

"The National Renaissance Party: History and Analysis of an American Neo-Nazi Political Party" by William Goring in National Information Center Newsletter (December 1969-January 1970, Springfield, Massachusetts)
Black Sun: Aryan Cults, Esoteric Nazism and the Politics of Identity (Chap. 4 in particular) by Nicholas Goodrick-Clarke (2001)
Dreamer of the Day: Francis Parker Yockey and the postwar fascist international (Chap. 42 in particular) by Kevin Coogan (Autonomedia, Brooklyn, NY, 1998)
The Beast Reawakens by Martin A. Lee (New York: Little, Brown and Company, 1997) 
 (Biography of Dan Burros)
Phoenix Rising:  The Epic Saga Of James H. Madole by Kerry Bolton, Paraparaumu, 1996 (find here)
Selected writings of James H. Madole edited by Kerry Bolton (find here)

External links
After the Third Age: Eschatological Elements of Postwar International Fascism
The Neo-Nazi Face of the Extreme Right, chapter 6 of The Other Radicalism
HUAC report on Neo-Fascist groups, including the NRP
NRP FBI files obtained through the FOIA and hosted at the Internet Archive

Headquarters files Part 1
Headquarters files Part 2
Headquarters files Part 3
Headquarters files Part 4
Headquarters files Part 5
Headquarters files Part 6
Headquarters files Part 7
Headquarters files Part 8
Headquarters files Part 9
Headquarters files Part 10
Headquarters files Part 11
Headquarters files Part 12
Headquarters files Part 13
Headquarters files Part 14
Headquarters files Part 15
Headquarters files Part 16
Headquarters files Part 17
NYC office files Part 1
NYC office files Part 2
NYC office files Part 3
NYC office files Part 4
NYC office files Part 5
NYC office files Part 6
NYC office files Part 7
NYC office files Part 8
NYC office files Part 9
NYC office files Part 10
NYC office files Part 11
NYC office files Part 12
NYC office files Part 13
NYC office files Part 14
NYC office files Part 15
NYC office files Part 16
NYC office files Part 17
NYC office files Part 18
NYC office files Part 19
NYC office files Part 20
NYC office files Part 21
NYC office files Part 22
NYC office files Part 23
NYC office files Part 24
NYC office files Part 25

1949 establishments in the United States
Neo-Nazi political parties in the United States
Political parties established in 1949
Upper East Side
History of Manhattan
Defunct far-right political parties in the United States
Satanism and Nazism